Atelopus cruciger, also known as the Veragua stubfoot toad or Rancho Grande harlequin frog, is a species of toad in the family Bufonidae. It is endemic to Venezuela and is known from the central Venezuelan Coastal Range. The species was already suspected to be extinct because, despite considerable effort, none had been found since 1986. However, in 2003, a small population was found, with few other locations discovered later. It is mainly threatened by chytridiomycosis. It is locally called sapito rayado.

Description
Adult males measure  and adult females  in snout–vent length. The body is slender. The snout is pointed in dorsal view. No tympanum is visible, but the supratympanic crest is well developed. There are small rounded warts present on the dorsolateral surfaces, most prominently around the arm insertions and as a dorsolateral row. The fingers have basal webbing while the toes are slightly more webbed. The hind limbs are relatively long. Preserved specimens have greenish tan color that is lighter on the ventral side. The dorsal surfaces have dense brown vermiculation as well as a X-pattern behind the head.

Diet
The main sources of food for these frogs are ants and other small insects.

Habitat and conservation
Atelopus cruciger usually occurs near streams and rivulets. These frogs are diurnal and often found on stones, but can also climb to vegetation up to 1.5 meters above the ground. Breeding takes place along swift-flowing streams.

However, the species has undergone a dramatic decline, and only few populations are known to persist. These are all at low altitudes on the northern slope of the Henri Pittier National Park. The main reason for the decline is believed to be chytridiomycosis. Many of the historic collections came from protected areas. Air pollution (acid rain) could also be a contributing factor, given the proximity to the industries in the Valencia-Maracay area.

In culture
The frog appears on the reverse side of the Venezuelan Bs.S 5 banknote.

References

cruciger
Endemic fauna of Venezuela
Amphibians of Venezuela
Amphibians described in 1856
Taxa named by Hinrich Lichtenstein
Taxa named by Eduard von Martens
Taxonomy articles created by Polbot